Ovation UKII, or Ultra Kaman II, is a solid body electric guitar produced by Ovation Guitars.

The guitar featured a hollow body aluminum frame encased in a mold of urelite, a dense urethane foam. This made the guitar light, and the hollowness gave it a very distinct sound. The neck of the guitar was glued to the body and then bolted to the frame, so that along with the hollow body this would allow for maximum sustain. The pickups were custom-made by Ovation. Each coil was wound 10,000 times, more than most pickups, resulting in a high amplitude. The pickups also included switches that would switch the wiring in the pickups from in series to parallel, effectively turning the hum bucker into a single coil in sound quality on the fly. The guitar also had a mono and a stereo output, where the stereo separated the two pickups into their own channels. 

The UKII came in several varieties:
 chrome or gold hardware (bridge/tuners/etc)
 several finishes usually painted to look like the grain of wood
 abalone rectangle inlays or mother of pearl bowties (signature look) on the fretboard which was made of ebony
 an optional pickguard

The number of UKII's produced is not known, but ranges between 2,000 - 3,000 between 1979 and 1983. Like all other ovation solid body guitars of the time, it came with its own serial number and brown hard case. Ovation stopped producing solid bodies in the mid 80s and the UKII has become a collector's items along with other Ovation solid bodies like the Breadwinner and Ultra GP.

Electric guitars